Lagocheirus araneiformis is a species of longhorn beetle of the subfamily Lamiinae. It was described by Carl Linnaeus in his 1767 12th edition of Systema Naturae.

Subspecies
 Lagocheirus araneiformis araneiformis (Linnaeus, 1767)
 Lagocheirus araneiformis curacaoensis Gilmour, 1968
 Lagocheirus araneiformis flavolineatus Aurivillius, 1921
 Lagocheirus araneiformis fulvescens Dillon, 1957
 Lagocheirus araneiformis guadeloupensis Dillon, 1957
 Lagocheirus araneiformis insulorum Dillon, 1957
 Lagocheirus araneiformis stroheckeri Dillon, 1956

Description
The basic coloration of these longhorn beetles is grey brown. They are considered a pest of cassava (Manihot esculenta) and sugar cane (Saccharum species).

Distribution
This species can be found in Mexico, Ecuador, Honduras, Antilles, Peru and Venezuela.

References

 BioLib
 Discover Life
 Lamiaires du monde
 Andrew B. S. King, Joseph L. Saunders The Invertebrate Pests of Annual Food Crops in Central America

Beetles described in 1767
Taxa named by Carl Linnaeus
araneiformis